2022 in men's road cycling includes the 2022 men's bicycle races governed by the Union Cycliste Internationale. The races are part of the UCI Road Calendar.

World Championships

The Road World Championships were held in Wollongong, New South Wales, Australia from 18 to 25 September 2022.

Grand Tours

UCI World Tour

The 2022 calendar was announced in the autumn of 2021.

UCI ProSeries

Championships

National Championships

UCI Teams

UCI WorldTeams
The following eighteen teams have received a UCI WorldTour license for the 2022 season.

UCI ProTeams and Continental Teams

Notes

References

 

Men's road cycling by year